Al-Masaniʽ is a historical neighborhood and a subject of Baladiyah al-Shifa in southern Riyadh, Saudi Arabia, south of Manfuhah. The neighborhood traces its origins to an ancient agricultural village situated on the eastern edge of Wadi Hanifa in al-Yamama during pre-Islamic Arabia that was known for its cultivation of palm groves. It was also mentioned in Yaqut al-Hamawi's 13th century work Kitāb Mu'jam al-Buldān and was incorporated into the modern metropolis of Riyadh during the city's multiple phases of modernization and expansion in the 1950s and 1970s.

References 

Neighbourhoods in Riyadh